The State Surveillance and Defense Police (Polícia de Vigilância e Defesa do Estado) (PVDE) was a police force of the Portuguese State, which operated between 1933 and 1945. The PVDE was responsible for border surveillance, control of foreigners, immigration control, and state security.

Portuguese intelligence agencies
National security institutions
Defunct law enforcement agencies of Portugal
Estado Novo (Portugal)
1933 establishments in Portugal
1945 disestablishments in Portugal